Miss Colombia 2017 was the 64th edition of the Miss Colombia pageant. It was held on March 20, 2017 in Cartagena, Colombia.

At the end of the event, Andrea Tovar of Chocó crowned Laura González of Cartagena D.T. and C as Miss Colombia 2017. She represented Colombia in Miss Universe 2017 and placed 1st Runner-Up.

Results

Color keys 

  The contestant was a Finalist/Runner-up in an International pageant.
 The contestant did not place.

Scores 
 Miss Colombia 2017
 1st Runner-up
 2nd Runner-up
 3rd Runner-up
 4th Runner-up
 Top 10

Specials Awards

Delegates 
23 delegates have been selected to compete.

References

External links
 Official website

2017 in Colombia
Miss Colombia
Colombia